Alsóregmec is a village in Borsod-Abaúj-Zemplén county, Hungary.

Few Jews lived in the village and there is still a Jewish cemetery there. Many of them were murdered in the Holocaust.

Notable residents
 Ferenc Kazinczy (1759 – 1831), Hungarian author, poet, neologist

References

External links 
 Street map 

Populated places in Borsod-Abaúj-Zemplén County
Jewish communities destroyed in the Holocaust